Dunnstown is the name of several geographic localities:

Dunnstown, Victoria, a town in Australia
Dunnstown, Pennsylvania, a census-designated place in the United States of America